The Argentine legislative elections of 1965 were held on 14 March. Voters chose their legislators with a turnout of 83%.

Background

The exiled populist leader, Juan Perón, continued to set the electoral agenda. The economy had recovered vigorously from the 1962-63 recession, and this only seemed to deprive voters and the media of a distraction away from speculation as to what steps Perón might take next to return to Argentina. This issue was highlighted by his failed December 1964 attempt to arrive in Buenos Aires - thwarted almost by accident. His still-sizable Peronist base, in turn, were divided between those who felt his return was critical to their political future, and those who sought alternatives. One of the most successful projects to these ends was the Popular Union (UP), a party founded within days of Perón's violent, September 1955 overthrow. Its founder, Juan Atilio Bramuglia, had been a close advisor of Perón's since the birth of the movement, in 1945. Bramuglia had been unable, however, to obtain support for the idea from Perón himself, who favored electoral alliances. Bramuglia died in 1962; but the failure of one such alliance in 1963 provided Popular Union supporters with their first realistic chance to represent the aging leader.

The President, Dr. Arturo Illia, faced immediate pressure from the military and other anti-peronists to bar the Popular Union from fielding any candidates; but the moderate Illia refused. The adoption of the UP mantle by Steelworkers' leader Augusto Vandor defied Perón's call for open conflict with the Illia administration, moreover. The issue of the UP divided Vandor and his allies in the CGT from the CGT Secretary General, José Alonso, and his allies (including Andrés Framini, who had run on the UP ticket in 1962 and won, only to have the elections annulled). Vandor's very prominence made him the UP's paramount figure, and by extension, the first viable Peronist alternative to Perón in the movement's twenty years of existence.

Despite fears this might trigger a coup, the elections proceeded on schedule. President Illia's centrist UCR did not benefit from economic growth, and they lost 4 seats. Former President Pedro Aramburu's anti-peronist UDELPA benefited even less from Perón's barely thwarted return, and they lost half their 14 seats. Former President Arturo Frondizi's MID, which had been barred from running by conservative opposition in 1963, picked up 16 seats in its first electoral test. This was significant because the MID had bested his former party, the UCRI (with which he had parted ways in 1963). The UCRI was left with but 11 of its 40 seats, the result of losing both Frondizi's and Perón's erstwhile support. Most of these seats went to the Popular Union, which gained 44. Its leader, Dr. Rodolfo Tecera del Franco, was elected Vice President of the Argentine Chamber of Deputies.

The 1965 elections were a notable accomplishment for President Illia, who had stopped military interference against them without it immediately costing him the presidency.

Results

Results by province

References

1965
1965 elections in Argentina
March 1965 events in South America